HSBC Bank A.Ş., the Turkey subsidiary of the HSBC Group, is a bank with its head office in Istanbul.

History
HSBC Bank A.Ş. was established as Midland Bank A.Ş. in 1990. It was a subsidiary of Midland Bank and was the first British bank in Turkey to be established. Then it was renamed HSBC Bank A.Ş. in 1999. In October 2001, HSBC Bank A.Ş. acquired Demirbank T.A.Ş., the fifth-largest private bank in Turkey from the Turkish financial regulator after it was rescued, during the financial crisis. Demirbank's wholly owned stockbroking and fund management subsidiary, Demir Yatirim was also acquired and the merger of HSBC Bank A.Ş. and Demirbank was successfully  completed in December 2001. Other subsidiaries of HSBC Bank A.Ş. are HSBC Ödeme Sistemleri Bilgisayar Teknolojileri Basın Yayın ve Müşteri Hizmetleri A.Ş., HSBC İnternet ve Telekominikasyon Hizmetleri A.Ş.

Turkish banking

Under the HSBC brand the bank maintains a network of around 77 branches nationwide (as of July 2020) and offers a comprehensive range of products and services to corporate, commercial and personal customers. HSBC Turkey is part of the European structure within the HSBC Group and therefore reports to HSBC Bank plc.

Bombing

On 20 November 2003, HSBC's headquarters on the Büyükdere Avenue in Levent neighborhood of Şişli, Istanbul were severely damaged in one of a series of bombings in Istanbul in 2003. Three members of HSBC staff lost their lives and a total of 43 were injured in the blasts.

The bank was fully open for business on the following working day, with a temporary headquarters being established in Esentepe, Istanbul and over 3,000 corporate customers informed of the situation on the day of the blast.

Consumer finance
On 8 August 2002, HSBC Bank A.Ş. signed a Sale and Purchase Agreement for the acquisition of Benkar Tuketici Finansmani ve Kart Hizmetleri A.Ş. (Consumer finance and card services) and the Advantage brand from Boyner Holding A.Ş. The purchase of Benkar was completed on 19 September 2002.

Regional operations
HSBC Bank A.Ş. operated 4 branches in the Turkish Republic of Northern Cyprus until the end of 2017. As of 1 December 2017, Friday, HSBC Bank TRNC Operations were transferred to ALBANK.

References

External links 

 
Turkey
Banks of Turkey
Companies listed on the Istanbul Stock Exchange
Banks established in 1990
Investment banks
Primary dealers
Holding companies of Turkey